Thomas Cullen Daly  (1918– 2011) was a Canadian film producer, film editor and film director, who was the head of Studio B at the National Film Board of Canada (NFB).  

During his 44-year career, Daly produced, edited and/or directed 315 films. His remarkable awards roster includes eight BAFTA awards, eight Venice Film Festival awards, seven Cannes Film Festival awards and ten Oscar nominations. On April 27, 2000, he was appointed an Officer of the Order of Canada.

Early life
Thomas Cullen Daly was the second of three children born to Katherine Cullen Daly and Richard Arthur Daly. His was a prominent family; his mother was a Forest Hill socialite and his father was a stockbroker and founder of R.A. Daly and Company. Tom attended Upper Canada College and then University College, Toronto. There, he sat on the school’s Art Committee and, as a member of the College Literary and Athletic Society, acted in and directed plays and musicals, and won first prize for a poem called Musician’s Lament. He was also his class president and, in a 1938 address, advised fellow students to “not attempt too much…it is better to do one thing, or a few things, well.”

Daly graduated in 1940 and sought to go into the field of information, or anti-propaganda communication.  A year earlier, the Canadian government had created the National Film Board of Canada, which was a perfect fit for Daly’s aspirations. He asked his Upper Canada College principal, the very highly-regarded Terence MacDermot, for a letter of reference. MacDermot wrote directly to NFB Commissioner John Grierson, telling him that Daly was “A first-rate classical scholar…clever and quick above the average, with a ready pen and refreshing personality….Remember he can create with his pen, and his flair is dramatic. If you can find a place for a possible soldier in that (information)  field, I think you would be repaid by his dog-like devotion and talents.” Daly did not see this letter until his retirement party in 1984.  But he was hired and, in the fall of 1940, moved to Ottawa.

Career
Daly was passionate about assisting in the NFB's war effort. Grierson was taken with his intellect and bookish manner and hired him as a production assistant, jokingly calling him "the best butler in the business", an expression which would serve as the title for film scholar D.B. Jones's decades later book on Daly, The Best Butler in the Business: Tom Daly of the National Film Board of Canada. Daly learned the art of film editing from filmmaker Stuart Legg; while he is not credited until 1943, it is likely that Daly worked on some of Legg's 1940-1942 films.

Unit B
As head of the NFB's Unit B, Daly was involved in, or responsible for, numerous milestones and achievements in both documentary and animation film art, including Cinéma vérité and Direct Cinema productions. He was also heavily involved in the multi-projector cinematic presentation In the Labyrinth, which eventually led to the development of IMAX. Daly was persuaded to put aside his studio responsibilities for a year and a half to edit In the Labyrinth.

Daly also produced such works as Colin Low's Corral, Wolf Koenig and Roman Kroitor’s Lonely Boy, Koenig and Low’s City of Gold, Kroitor and Low’s Universe, Arthur Lipsett’s Very Nice, Very Nice, Robin Spry's One Man, and Gerald Potterton’s animated short My Financial Career. Daly also served as executive producer on Candid Eye, a 14-part cinema-vérité series made between 1958 and 1961.

Daly ran a mixed-discipline studio that included many of the most talented Canadian film-makers of the time, including an animation group with Norman McLaren, Don Arioli, and Robert Verrall; a documentary team including Roman Kroitor and Terence Macartney-Filgate. Both Colin Low and Wolf Koenig worked at various times in both areas.

Retirement and death
In 1980, Daly received an honorary doctorate from Concordia University. He was appointed an Officer of the Order of Canada in 2000.

He died on September 18, 2011, after a lengthy illness, at the Chateau Westmount residence in Westmount, Quebec.

Filmography
All for the National Film Board of Canada

The Gates of Italy - documentary short, Stuart Legg 1943 - co-writer, -editor and -producer with Stuart Legg
Battle of Europe - documentary short, Stuart Legg 1944 - co-writer, -editor and -producer with Stuart Legg
Inside France - documentary short 1944 - producer, co-director with Stuart Legg
Our Northern Neighbour - documentary short 1944 - editor, director
Atlantic Crossroads - documentary short 1945 - editor, director, co-producer with Grant McLean
Guilty Men - documentary short 1945 - writer, producer, director
Ordeal by Ice - documentary short 1945 - producer, director
Road to the Reich - documentary short 1945 - writer, producer, director
Canada: World Trader - documentary 1946 - producer, director
The Challenge of Housing - documentary short 1946 - producer, director
Out of the Ruins - documentary short, Nicholas Read 1946 - producer
Eye Witness No. 1: Chalk River, Industrialization in South Africa - documentary short 1947 - co-producer with Don Mulholland
The People Between - documentary short, Grant McLean 1947 - producer, editor, co-writer with Grant McLean
Canadian International Trade Fair - documentary short, Ronald Dick 1948 - producer 
Who Will Teach Your Child? - documentary short, Stanley Jackson 1948 - co-producer with Gudrun Parker
Hungry Minds - documentary short 1948 - producer, director
Yellowknife, Canada - documentary short 1948 - producer, director
Children’s Concert - documentary, Gudrun Parker 1949 - co-editor with Guy Glover 
Family Circles - documentary short, Ronald Dick 1949 - co-producer with Gudrun Parker
Science at Your Service - documentary short, Ronald Dick 1949 - editor, producer
Teeth Are to Keep - animated short, Jim MacKay and Dino Rigolo 1949 - producer
On Stage - instructional short, Ronald Dick 1949 - producer
4 Songs by 4 Gentlemen - sing-song film, Michael Spencer 1950 - executive producer
Making Primitive Stone Tools - documentary short, Douglas Leechman 1950 - producer
The Unadulterated Truth - documentary short, Ron Weyman 1950 - producer
Folksong Fantasy - animated puppet film, Alma Duncan 1950 - producer
Rhythm and Percussion - documentary, Gudrun Parker 1950 - co-editor with Guy Glover
A Friend at the Door - documentary short, Leslie McFarlane 1950 - co-producer with James Beveridge
Family Tree - animated short film, George Dunning and Evelyn Lambart 1950 - producer
Feelings of Depression - documentary short, Stanley Jackson 1950 - producer
Sing a Little - animated puppet film, Jean-Paul Ladoceur and Evelyn Lambart 1951 - producer
Sur le Pont d'Avignon - puppet film, Wolf Koenig and Jean-Paul Ladouceur 1951 - producer
The Longhouse People - documentary short, Allan Wargon 1951 - producer
V for Volunteers - documentary short, Leslie McFarlane 1951 - producer
Royal Journey - documentary short, David Bairstow, Gudrun Parker and Roger Blais 1951 - producer
Breakdown - documentary, Robert Anderson 1951 - executive producer
Caribou Hunters - documentary short, Stephen Greenlees 1951 - producer
Pen Point Percussion - documentary short, Norman McLaren 1951 - co-producer with Norman McLaren
Canada’s Awakening North - documentary short, Ronald Dick 1951 - editor
Fighting Forest Fires with Hand Tools - training film, Lawrence Cherry 1951 - producer
Fighting Forest Fires with Power Pumps - training film, Lawrence Cherry 1951 - producer
Lismer - documentary short, Allan Wargon 1951 - producer
Trade Fair - documentary short, Robert Anderson 1952 - producer
Warp and Weft - documentary short, Betty Brunke 1952 - producer
Age of the Beaver - documentary short, Colin Low 1952 - producer
The Romance of Transportation in Canada, Colin Low 1952 - producer
The Newcomers - documentary short, David Bennett 1953 - producer
Varley - documentary short, Allan Wargon 1953 - producer
Winter in Canada - documentary short, Guy L. Coté 1953 - producer
Dick Hickey - Blacksmith - documentary short, David Bennett 1953 - executive producer
Canadian Notebook - documentary short, David Bennett 1953 - producer
Paul Tomkowicz: Street-railway Switchman - documentary short, Roman Kroitor 1953 - editor, co-producer with Roman Kroitor
Shyness - documentary, Stanley Jackson 1953 - producer
Rescue Party - training film, Roman Kroitor 1953 - producer
A Shocking Affair - animated short, Laurence Hyde 1953 - executive producer
Poison Ivy Picnic - animated short, Laurence Hyde 1953 - producer
Corral - documentary short 1954 - producer 
A Thousand Million Years - animated short, Colin Low 1954 - producer
The Homeless Ones - documentary short, Leslie McFarlane 1954 - executive producer
The Magnificent - documentary short, Julian Biggs 1954 - editor
Salt Cod - documentary short, Allan Wargon 1954 - producer
One Little Indian - puppet film, Grant Munro 1954 - co-producer with Colin Low
Look Before You Leap - animated short, Laurence Hyde 1954 - executive producer
Physical Regions of Canada - documentary short 1954 - producer, director
Mountains of the West - documentary short, Donald Fraser 1954 - executive producer
Iron from the North - documentary short, Walford Hewitson 1955 - producer
No Longer Vanishing - documentary short, Grant McLean 1955 - producer
The Structure of Unions - animated short, Morten Parker 1955 - executive producer
Riches of the Earth - documentary short, Colin Low 1955 - producer
Grain Handling in Canada - documentary short, Guy L. Coté 1955 - producer
Look Alert, Stay Unhurt - short film, Gordon Burwash 1955 - editor
Gold - documentary short, Colin Low 1955 - producer 
Farm Calendar - documentary short, Roman Kroitor 1955 - producer
The Jolifou Inn - documentary short, Colin Low 1955 - producer
To Serve the Mind - short film, Stanley Jackson 1955 - producer
Canadian Venture - documentary, Caryl Doncaster 1956 - producer
Introducing Canada - documentary short 1956 - producer, director, co-editor with Roman Kroitor
Forest Fire Suppression - documentary short, Lawrence Cherry 1956 - producer
The Great Lakes - St Lawrence Lowlands - documentary short, Betty Brunke 1956 - producer
City of Gold - documentary short, Colin Low and Wolf Koenig 1957 - editor, producer
The Great Plains - documentary short, Roman Kroitor 1957 - producer
It’s a Crime - animated short, Wolf Koenig 1957 - producer
Carpenters of the Forest - documentary short, Heinz Sielmann 1957 - executive producer
Blue Vanguard: Revised - documentary, Ian MacNeill 1957 - producer
The Atlantic Region - documentary short, Donald Fraser 1957 - producer
Canadian Profile - documentary, Allan Wargon 1957 - producer
The Precambrian Shield - documentary short, David Bennett 1957 - producer
Profile of a Problem Drinker - documentary short, Stanley Jackson 1957 - producer
Putting it Straight - documentary short, William Greaves 1957 - producer
Looking Beyond…Story of a Film Council - documentary short, Stanley Jackson 1958 - producer
High Arctic: Life on the Land - documentary, Dalton Muir 1958 - executive producer
The Changing Forest - documentary short, Maurice Constant 1958 - executive producer
The Face of the High Arctic - documentary short, Dalton Muir 1958 - executive producer
Railroaders - documentary short, Guy L. Coté 1958 - executive producer
Smoke and Weather - documentary short, William Greaves 1958 - executive producer
Stigma - short film, Stanley Jackson 1958 - executive producer
Trans Canada Summer - documentary, Ronald Dick 1958 - producer
Wheat Rust - documentary short, Maurice Constant 1958 - executive producer
Blood and Fire - documentary short (Candid Eye), Terence Macartney-Filgate 1958 - executive producer
A Foreign Language - documentary short (Candid Eye), Stanley Jackson 1958 - executive producer
Country Threshing - documentary short (Candid Eye), Wolf Koenig 1958 - executive producer
Pilgrimage - documentary short (Candid Eye), Terence Macartney-Filgate 1958 - executive producer, co-editor with Lucien Marleau
Memory of Summer - documentary short (Candid Eye), Stanley Jackson 1958 - executive producer
Police - documentary short (Candid Eye), Terence Macartney-Filgate 1958 - executive producer
The Days Before Christmas - documentary short (Candid Eye), Terence Macartney-Filgate, Stanley Jackson and Wolf Koenig 1958 - executive producer
Glenn Gould - Off the Record - documentary short (Candid Eye), Wolf Koenig and Roman Kroitor 1959 - executive producer 
Glenn Gould - On the Record - documentary short (Candid Eye), Wolf Koenig and Roman Kroitor 1959 - executive producer
Emergency Ward - documentary short (Candid Eye), William Greaves 1959 - executive producer
The Back-Breaking Leaf - documentary short (Candid Eye), Terence Macartney-Filgate 1959 - executive producer
End of the Line - documentary short (Candid Eye), Terence Macartney-Filgate 1959 - executive producer
Gateway to Asia - documentary short 1959 - editor, producer, director
City Out of Time - documentary short, Colin Low 1959 - producer
Fishermen - documentary short, Guy L. Coté 1959 - executive producer
The Canadians - documentary short, Terence Macartney-Filgate 1959 - editor, producer, director
The Living Stone - documentary short, John Feeney 1959 - producer
Pangnirtung - documentary short, John Feeney 1959 - producer
Fifty Miles from Poona - documentary short, Fali Bilimoria 1959 - producer
Radiation - documentary short, Hugh O'Connor 1959 - executive producer
A is for Architecture - documentary short, Gerald Budner and Robert Verrall 1960 - co-producer with Colin Low
Universe - documentary short, Colin Low and Roman Kroitor 1960 - editor, producer
Circle of the Sun - documentary short, Colin Low 1960 - editor, producer
Above the Timberline: The Alpine Tundra Zone - J.V. Durden 1960 - executive producer
Arctic Outpost: Pangnirtung N.W.T. - documentary short, John Feeney 1960 - producer
I Was a Ninety-Pound Weakling - documentary short, Wolf Koenig and Georges Dufaux 1960 - executive producer
Interview with Linus Pauling - documentary, Joe Koenig 1960 - executive producer
Life in the Woodlot - documentary short, Dalton Muir 1960 - executive producer
Microscopic Fungi - documentary short, J.V. Durden 1960 - executive producer
The Price of Fire - documentary short, Bruce Parsons 1960 - executive producer
Roughnecks: The Story of Oil Drillers - documentary short, Guy L. Coté 1960 - producer
The Cars in Your Life - documentary short (Candid Eye), Terence Macartney-Filgate 1960 - executive producer
Festival in Puerto Rico - documentary short (Candid Eye), Wolf Koenig and Roman Kroitor 1961 - executive producer
Very Nice, Very Nice - documentary short, Arthur Lipsett 1961 - co-producer with Colin Low
The Days of Whiskey Gap - documentary short, Colin Low 1961 - executive producer
Cattle Ranch - documentary short, Guy L. Coté 1961 - executive producer
Do You Know the Milky Way? - documentary short, Colin Low 1961 - executive producer
New York Lightboard - promotional short, Norman McLaren 1961 - producer
Snow - documentary short, Barrie McLean 1961 - executive producer
Trout Stream - documentary short, Hugh O'Connor 1961 - executive producer
University - documentary, Stanley Jackson 1961 - executive producer
Lonely Boy - documentary short, Wolf Koenig and Roman Kroitor 1962 - executive producer
The Climates of North America - documentary short, Joe Koenig 1962 - executive producer
21-87 - documentary short, Arthur Lipsett 1963 - co-producer with Colin Low
Experimental Film - documentary short, Arthur Lipsett 1962 - producer
Runner - documentary short, Don Owen 1962 - producer
The Joy of Winter - documentary short, Jean Dansereau and Bernard Gosselin 1962 - executive producer
Kindergarten - documentary short, Guy L. Coté 1962 - producer
The Living Machine - documentary, Roman Kroitor 1962 - producer
My Financial Career - animated short, Gerald Potterton 1962 - co-producer with Colin Low
The Peep Show - cartoon, Kaj Pindal 1962 - executive producer
The Great Toy Robbery - cartoons, Jeff Hale 1963 - executive producer
Christmas Cracker - short film, Norman McLaren, Jeff Hale, Gerald Potterton and Grant Munro 1963 - executive producer
A Christmas Fantasy - short film, John Feeney 1963 - producer
I Know an Old Lady Who Swallowed a Fly - cartoon, Derek Lamb 1963 - executive producer
The Origins of Weather - documentary short, Joe Koenig 1963 - executive producer
Pipers and A’ - documentary short, Austin Campbell 1963 - producer
The Ride - short film, Gerald Potterton 1963 - executive producer
Sky - experimental film, John Feeney 1963 - producer
Toronto Jazz - documentary short, Don Owen 1963 - executive producer
The World of David Milne - documentary short, Gerald Budner 1963 - co-producer with Colin Low
An Essay on Science - documentary short, Guy L. Coté 1964 - producer
Free Fall - short film, Arthur Lipsett 1964 - co-producer with Colin Low
Country Auction - documentary short, Roy Nolan and Ron Tunis 1964 - producer
The Edge of the Barrens - documentary short, Dalton Muir 1964 - executive producer
Eskimo Artist: Kenojuak - documentary short, John Feeney 1964 - producer
Antigonish - documentary short, Stanley Jackson 1964 - executive producer
Above the Horizon - documentary short, Roman Kroitor and Hugh O'Connor 1964 - executive producer
The Hutterites - documentary short, Colin Low 1964 - co-producer with Roman Kroitor
Nobody Waved Good-bye - feature, Don Owen 1964 - executive producer
Jet Pilot - documentary short, Joe Koenig 1964 - producer 
Legault's Place - documentary short, Suzanne Angel 1964 - co-producer with Roman Kroitor
The Persistent Seed - short film, Christopher Chapman 1964 - executive producer
Two-and-a-Half - documentary short, Brian Pearce 1964 - producer
Two Men of Montreal - documentary, Suzanne Angel, Donald Brittain and Don Owen 1965 - co-producer with Donald Brittain, Roman Kroitor and John Kemeny
Experienced Hands - documentary short, Theodore Conant 1965 - executive producer
The Sea Got in Your Blood - documentary short, David Millar 1965 - producer
Take It from the Top - documentary short, Eugene Boyko 1966 - co-producer with Peter Jones
Stravinksy - documentary, Roman Kroitor and Wolf Koenig 1966 - executive producer
The Forest - documentary short 1966 - editor and director
Helicopter Canada - documentary, Eugene Boyko 1966 - co-producer with Peter Jones
Antonio - documentary short, Tony Ianzelo 1966 - producer
Island Observed - documentary short, Hector Lemieux 1966 - producer
Satan’s Choice - documentary short, Donald Shebib 1966 - producer
Kurelek - documentary short, William Pettigrew 1967 - executive producer, co-producer with Robert Verrall
Niagara Falls - short film, Derek May 1967 - producer
Poen - experimental short, Josef Reeve 1967 - producer
In the Labyrinth - experimental film, Roman Kroitor, Hugh O'Connor and Colin Low 1967 - editor, co-producer with Roman Kroitor
Christopher's Movie Matinée - documentary short, Mort Ransen 1968 - associate producer
Sir! Sir! - documentary short, Michael Rubbo 1968 - co-producer with Cecily Burwash
Danny and Nicky - documentary, Douglas Jackson 1969 - executive producer
Falling from Ladders - documentary short, Mort Ransen 1969 - co-producer with John Kemeny and Joe Koenig
Mrs. Ryan’s Drama Class - documentary short, Michael Rubbo 1969 - co-producer with Cecily Burwash
If He Is Devoured, I Win - experimental film, Rick Raxlen 1969 - co-producer with Stanley Jackson
McBus - short film, Derek May 1969 - producer
Prologue - feature, Robin Spry 1969 - co-producer with Robin Spry
Sad Song of Yellow Skin - documentary, Michael Rubbo 1970 - producer
Girls of Mountain Street - documentary short, Susan Huycke 1970 - producer
Half-Half-Three-Quarters-Full - documentary short 1970 - with Barrie Howells, producer, director
Pillar of Wisdom - documentary short, Josef Reeve 1970 - producer
Espolio - short film, Sidney Goldsmith 1970 - producer
A Film for Max - documentary, Derek May 1970 - producer
Here’s to Harry’s Grandfather - documentary, Michael Rubbo 1970 - producer
The Burden They Carry - documentary short, Mort Ransen 1970 - co-producer with John Kemeny
Legend - short film, Rick Raxlen 1970 - producer
N-Zone - experimental film, Arthur Lipsett 1970 - executive producer
November - short film, Robert Nichol 1970 - producer
Overspill - documentary short, Mort Ransen 1970 - co-producer with John Kemeny
A Place for Everything - documentary short, Eric M. Nilsson 1970 - co-producer with John Kemeny and Joe Koenig
A Rosewood Daydream - documentary short, Ian MacNeill 1970 - executive producer
Untouched and Pure - documentary, Mort Ransen, Martin Duckworth and Christopher Cordeaux 1970 - co-producer with John Kemeny
Where Have All the Farms Gone? - documentary short, Michael Brun 1970 - producer
The Winds of Fogo - documentary short, Colin Low 1970 - producer
The Wish - documentary short, Martin Duckworth 1970 - producer
Wake Up, Mes Bons Amis - documentary, Pierre Perrault 1970 - co-producer with Paul Larose and Guy L. Coté
Anger After Death - documentary short, Rick Raxlen 1971 - producer
God Help the Man Who Would Part with His Land - documentary short, George C. Stoney 1971 - co-producer with Colin Low
Atomic Juggernaut - documentary short, Eugene Boyko 1971 - co-producer with Walford Hewitson
Persistent and Finagling - documentary, Michael Rubbo 1971 - producer
Summer’s Nearly Over - documentary short, Michael Rubbo 1971 - producer
Wet Earth and Warm People - documentary, Michael Rubbo 1971 - producer 
Garden - animation experiment, Christopher Nutter 1971 - producer
Dance Class - documentary short, Joan Henson 1971 - executive producer
Improv - short film, Joan Henson 1971 - producer
The Mechanical Knee - documentary short, Claudia Overing 1971 - co-producer with Jean Roy
Norman Jewison, Film Maker - documentary, Douglas Jackson 1971 - executive producer
Once…Agadir - documentary short, Jacques Bensimon 1971 - executive producer
Pandora - experimental film, Derek May 1971 - producer
Paper Boy - short film, Clay Borris 1971 - producer
Pearly Yeats - experimental short, Bruce Mackay 1971 - producer
Saskatchewan: 45 Below - documentary short, Larry Kent 1971 - co-producer with Joe Koenig
The Sea - documentary short, Bané Jovanovic 1971 - co-producer with Colin Low and William Brind
This Is a Photograph - documentary short, Albert Kish 1971 - producer
Three Guesses - documentary short, Joan Henson 1971 - executive producer
Beware, Beware, My Beauty Fair - documentary short, Jean Lafleur and Peter Svatek 1972 - executive producer
Centaur - documentary short, Susan Huycke 1972 - producer
Cold Pizza - documentary short, Larry Kent 1972 - producer
Cowboy and Indian - documentary, Don Owen 1972 - producer
The Huntsman - short film, Douglas Jackson 1972 - executive producer
Light to Starboard - documentary, Jerry Krepakevich 1972 - executive producer
Louisbourg - documentary short, Albert Kish 1972 - producer
Mirage - short film, Rick Raxlen 1972 - producer
One Hand Clapping - documentary short, Joan Henson 1972 - executive producer
The Sloane Affair - drama, Douglas Jackson 1972 - executive producer
Coming Home - documentary, Bill Reid 1973 - co-producer with Colin Low
Downhill - documentary short, Robin Spry 1973 - co-producer with Robin Spry
Accident - documentary short, Martin Duckworth and Patrick A. Crawley 1973 - producer
Action: The October Crisis of 1970 - documentary, Robin Spry 1973 - co-producer with Robin Spry and Normand Cloutier
Jalan, Jalan: A Journey in Sundanese Java - documentary short, Michael Rubbo 1973 - producer
The Man Who Can’t Stop - documentary, Michael Rubbo 1973 - co-producer with Richard Mason
The Streets of Saigon - documentary short, Michael Rubbo 1973 - producer
Tickets s.v.p. - animated short, Pierre Perrault 1973 - co-producer with Wolf Koenig
Reaction: A Portrait of a Society in Crisis - documentary, Robin Spry 1973 - co-producer with Normand Cloutier and Robin Spry
Child, Part 1: Jamie, Ethan and Marlon: The First Two Months - documentary short, Robert Humble 1973 - producer
Child, Part 2: Jamie, Ethan and Keir: 2-14 Months - documentary short, Robert Humble 1973 - producer
Child, Part 3: Debbie and Robert: 12-24 Months - documentary short, Robert Humble 1974 - producer
Mr. Symbol Man - documentary, Bruce Moir and Bob Kingsbury 1974 - co-producer with Frank Bagnall and Richard Mason
The Players - documentary, Donald Brittain 1974 - producer
Running Time - experimental film, Mort Ransen 1974 - co-producer with George Pearson
Sananguagat: Inuit Masterworks - documentary short, Derek May 1974 - producer
Thunderbirds in China - documentary, Les Rose 1974 - co-producer with Donald Brittain
Waiting for Fidel - documentary, Michael Rubbo 1974 - co-producer with Michael Rubbo
In Praise of Hands - documentary short, Donald Winkler 1975 - co-producer with Colin Low
Descent - documentary short, Giles Walker and Paul Cown 1975 - co-producer with Desmond Dew 
The Forest Watchers - documentary short, Peter Raymont 1975 - producer 
Earthware - documentary short, Rick Raxlen and Donald Winkler 1975 - co-producer with Colin Low and Rick Raxlen
Lumsden - documentary short, Peter Raymont 1975 - producer
Hinchinbrook Diary - documentary short, Rick Raxlen 1975 - producer
I Am an Old Tree - documentary, Michael Rubbo 1975 - co-producer with Michael Rubbo
Face - short film, Robin Spry 1975 - co-producer with Robin Spry
Cold Journey - documentary, Martin Defalco 1975 - co-editor with Torben Schioler
Alberta Girls - documentary short, Malca Gillson and Tony Ianzelo 1975 - producer
Metal Workers - documentary short, Robert Fortier and Donald Winkler 1975 - co-producer with Colin Low and Rick Raxlen
Musicanada - documentary, Malca Gillson and Tony Ianzelo 1975 - producer
No Way They Want to Slow Down - documentary short, Giles Walker 1975 - co-producer with Desmond Dew
The Sword of the Lord - documentary, Giles Walker 1976 - co-producer with Desmond Dew
Los Canadienses - documentary, Albert Kish 1976 - co-producer with Colin Low
The Great Clean-Up - documentary, James Carney 1976 - producer
Threads - documentary short, Donald Winkler and Anne Henderson 1976 - co-producer with Colin Low and Diane Beaudry 
Wax and Wool - documentary short, Donald Winkler and Rick Raxlen 1976 - co-producer with Colin Low and Rick Raxlen
Blackwood - documentary short, Tony Ianzelo and Andy Thomson 1976 - producer
Coaches - documentary, Paul Cown 1976 - producer
A Pinto for the Prince - documentary short 1976 - Colin Low and John Spotton - producer
River: Planet Earth - documentary short, Peter Raymont 1977 - producer 
You’re Eating For Two - documentary short, Malca Gillson 1977 - producer
Back Alley Blue - short film, Bill Reid 1977 - co-editor with David Wilson
I Hate to Lose - documentary, Michael Rubbo 1977 - producer
Child, Part 4: Kathy and Ian: Three-Year-Olds - documentary short, Robert Humble 1977 - producer
I’ll Go Again - documentary, Paul Cown 1977 - producer
One Man - feature, Robin Spry 1977 - co-producer with Vladimir Valenta, James de Beaujeu Domville and Michael J. F. Scott
Child, Part 5: 4 Years - 6 Years - documentary short, Robert Humble 1978 - co-producer with Dorothy Cortois
An Easy Pill to Swallow - documentary short, Robert Lang 1978 - producer
It Wasn’t Easy - documentary, Nico Crama 1978 - co-producer with Henk Suèr
Meditation in Motion - documentary short, Irene Angelico 1978 - producer
’round and ‘round - documentary, Barbara Greene 1978 - producer
Tigers and Teddy Bears - documentary short, Michael Rubbo 1978 - producer
Travel Log - experimental short, Donald Winkler 1978 - producer
China: A Land Transformed - documentary, Tony Ianzelo and Boyce Richardson 1980 - producer
North China Commune - documentary, Tony Ianzelo and Boyce Richardson 1980 - producer 
North China Factory - documentary, Tony Ianzelo and Boyce Richardson 1980 - producer
Wuxing People’s Commune - documentary, Tony Ianzelo and Boyce Richardson 1980 - producer
Co Hoedeman, Animator - documentary short, Nico Crama 1980 - producer
From the Ashes of War - documentary short, Michael McKennirey 1980 - co-producer with Nico Crama
The Last Days of Living - documentary, Malca Gillson 1980 - producer
The Lost Pharaoh: The Search for Akhenaten - documentary, Nicholas Kendall 1980 - co-producer with Nicholas Kendall
Stages - documentary, Paul Cown 1980 - producer
Earle Birney: Portrait of a Poet - documentary, Donald Winkler 1981 - producer
Off the Wall - documentary, Derek May 1981 - producer
Standing Alone - documentary, Colin Low 1982 - editor, producer
F.R. Scott: Rhyme and Reason - documentary, Donald Winkler 1982 - producer
Reflections on Suffering - documentary, Malca Gillson 1982 - producer
Time for Caring - documentary, Malca Gillson 1982 - producer
Singing: A Joy in Any Language - documentary, Malca Gillson and Tony Ianzelo 1983 - producer
The Road to Patriation - documentary, Robert Duncan 1984 - co-producer with Malca Gillson, Jennifer Torrance and Robert Duncan
Musical Magic: Gilbert and Sullivan in Stratford - documentary, Malca Gillson 1984 - producer

Awards
Who Will Teach Your Child? (1948)
 Scholastic Teacher Magazine Annual Film Awards: Top-Ten List: Best 16mm Information Films of 1949
 1st Canadian Film Awards, Ottawa: Best Theatrical Short, 1950

Science at Your Service (1949) 
 2nd Canadian Film Awards, Ottawa: Best Film, Non-Theatrical, Sponsored, 1953

Family Circles (1949)
 Cleveland Film Festival, Cleveland, Ohio: Best Film, Information: 1950
 2nd Canadian Film Awards, Ottawa: First Prize, Non-theatrical, 1950
 Scholastic Teachers Magazine Annual Film Awards, New York: Top-Ten List of 16mm Information Films of 1949, 1950
 SODRE International Festival of Documentary and Experimental Films, Montevideo: Special Mention, Cultural Films, 1955

Teeth Are to Keep (1949)
 Venice Film Festival, Venice: Silver Medal, 1950
 La Plata International Children's Film Festival, La Plata: First Prize, Preventive Medicine, 1961

Feelings of Depression (1950) 
 3rd Canadian Film Awards, Ottawa: Genie Award for Best Non-Theatrical Film, 1951

A Friend at the Door (1950)
 3rd Canadian Film Awards, Ottawa: Special Citation, Non-theatrical, 1951

Family Tree (1950) 
 Salerno Film Festival, Salerno: First Prize – Grand Award, Best of All Entries, 1951
 3rd Canadian Film Awards, Ottawa: Special Award for Outstanding Animation and Musical Score, 1951
 Rapallo International Film Festival, Rapallo: Second Prize, Art Films, 1957

Royal Journey (1951)
 4th Canadian Film Awards, Toronto: Best Theatrical Feature, Documentary, 1952
 6th British Academy Film Awards, London: BAFTA Award for Best Documentary, 1953

 The Longhouse People (1951)
 4th Canadian Film Awards, Toronto: Honourable Mention, Non-theatrical, 1952

Caribou Hunters (1951) 
 International Exhibition of Big Game Hunting and Fishing Films, Dusseldorf: Bronze Medal, 1954

Breakdown (1951) 
 Scholastic Teacher Magazine Annual Film Awards, New York: Outstanding 16mm Film of 1951, 1952
 International Review of Specialized Cinematography, Rome: Certificate of Honour, Film Production in General, 1955

Canada’s Awakening North (1951) 
 Venice Film Festival, Venice: First Prize, Geographical Films, 1951

Pen Point Percussion (1951)
 Venice Film Festival, Venice: Honourable Mention, Experimental Films, 1951

Fighting Forest Fires with Hand Tools (1951)
 Golden Reel International Film Festival, Film Council of America, New York: Recognition of Merit, Training, 1954

The Romance of Transportation in Canada (1952)  
 1953 Cannes Film Festival, Cannes: Award for Best Animation, 1953
 5th Canadian Film Awards, Montreal: Honourable Mention, 1953
 7th British Academy Film Awards, London: BAFTA Special Award, 1954
 25th Academy Awards, Los Angeles: Nominee, Best Short Subject, Cartoons, 1953

Lismer (1952)
 Yorkton Film Festival, Yorkton: First Prize, Cultural, 1952

Age of the Beaver (1952) 
 5th Canadian Film Awards, Toronto: Honorable Mention, Non-Theatrical, 1953

Varley (1953)
 Boston International Film Festival, Boston: Award of Merit, Arts, 1953

Paul Tomkowicz: Street-Railway Switchman (1953) 
 International Short Film Festival Oberhausen, Oberhausen: First Prize, 1958
 Edinburgh International Film Festival, Edinburgh: Diploma of Merit, Cultural, 1958
 International Filmfestival Mannheim-Heidelberg, Mannheim: Special Commendation of the Jury, 1958

Corral (1954) 
 Venice Film Festival, Venice: First Prize, Documentary Films, 1954
 Durban International Film Festival, Durban: Second Prize/Bronze Medal, Documentary, 1954
 Edinburgh International Film Festival, Edinburgh: Diploma of Merit, Arts, 1954
 Golden Reel International Film Festival, Film Council of America, New York: Recognition of Merit, 1955
 7th Canadian Film Awards, Toronto: Special Mention, Non-Theatrical Short, 1955

Physical Regions of Canada' (1954)
 Golden Reel International Film Festival, Film Council of America, New York: Recognition of Merit, Classroom Films (Junior and Senior High School), 1955Riches of the Earth (1954) 
 7th Canadian Film Awards, Toronto: Best Film, Non-Theatrical Short, 1955
 International Survey of Scientific and Didactic Films, Padua: First Prize for Best Film, 1956One Little Indian (1954) 
 National Committee on Films for Safety, Chicago: First Prize, Bronze Plaque, Traffic & Transportation, 1955
 Golden Reel International Film Festival, Film Council of America, New York: Recognition of Merit, 1955
 Kootenay Film Festival, Nelson, British Columbia: Certificate of Merit, Second Award, Artistic Achievement, 1955
 7th Canadian Film Awards, Toronto: Honorable Mention, Non-Theatrical, 1955
 Rapallo International Film Festival, Rapallo: Great Cup of the Province of Genoa, 1956
 Rapallo International Film Festival, Rapallo: First Prize & Silver Medal, Abstract Films, 1956A Thousand Million Years (1954) 
 Venice Film Festival, Venice: Honourable Mention, Scientific Films, 1954The Homeless Ones (1954)
 7th Canadian Film Awards: Honourable Mention, Non-theatrical Sponsored, 1955Iron from the North (1955)
 Columbus International Film & Animation Festival, Columbus, Ohio: Award of Merit, Information and Educational, 1956The Jolifou Inn (1955)
 Yorkton Film Festival, Yorkton: Golden Sheaf Award, Best Film, Creative Arts, 1956
 8th Canadian Film Awards, Stratford, Ontario: Honorable Mention, Theatrical Short, 1956 
 Kootenay Film Festival, Nelson, British Columbia: First Achievement Award, 1957
 Ibero-American-Filipino Documentary Film Contest, Bilbao: Best Film of an Educational and Cultural Character, 1959
 Ibero-American-Filipino Documentary Film Contest, Bilbao: Special Prize, 1959To Serve the Mind (1955)
 Golden Reel International Film Festival, Film Council of America, Chicago: Silver Reel, Health, 1956Gold (1955) 
 Edinburgh International Film Festival, Edinburgh: Diploma of Merit, 1955
 8th Canadian Film Awards, Stratford, Ontario: Gold Award, Theatrical Short, 1956 City of Gold (1957) 
 1957 Cannes Film Festival, Cannes: First Prize, Documentary, 1957
 Cork International Film Festival, Cork: First Prize - Statuette of St. Finbarr, General Interest 1957
 10th Canadian Film Awards, Toronto: Genie Award, Film of the Year 1958
 10th Canadian Film Awards, Toronto: Genie Award, Best Film, Arts and Experimental, 1958
 Vancouver International Film Festival, Vancouver: First Prize, Documentary 1958
 Yorkton Film Festival, Yorkton: Golden Sheaf Award, Best Film, General 1958
 International Festival of Mountain and Exploration Films, Trento: Gold Medal 1958 
 Chicago Festival of Contemporary Arts, University of Illinois Chicago: Documentary Prize 1958
 International Festival of Films on People and Countries, La Spezia: Gold Caravelle, 2nd prize 1958
 SODRE International Festival of Documentary and Experimental Films, Montevideo: Honourable Mention 1958
 Robert J. Flaherty Film Awards, City College Institute of Film Techniques: Honourable Mention, 1958
 Ibero-American-Filipino Documentary Film Contest, Bilbao: First Prize, 1959
 American Film and Video Festival, New York: Blue Ribbon, History & Biography, 1959
 Festival dei Popoli, Florence: Gold Medal, 1960
 Columbus International Film & Animation Festival, Columbus, Ohio: Chris Award, First Prize 1960
 Festival of Experimental and Documentary Films, Santiago: Honourable Mention 1960
 30th Academy Awards, Los Angeles: Nominee, Short Subject, Live Action, 1958Canadian Profile (1957)
 10th Canadian Film Awards, Toronto: Award of Merit, Non-Theatrical, General Information, 1958Blood and Fire (1958) 
 11th Canadian Film Awards, Toronto: Award of Merit, TV Information, 1959
 Ohio State Radio and TV Awards, Columbus, Ohio: First Prize, 1960The Changing Forest (1958)
 International Review of Specialized Cinematography, Rome: Silver Medal, 1959
 Scholastic Teachers Magazine Annual Film Awards, New York: Outstanding Scholastic Teacher's Award, 1960The Living Stone (1958) 
 International Filmfestival Mannheim-Heidelberg, Mannheim: Special Commendation, 1959
 Winnipeg Film Council Annual Film Festival, Winnipeg: Best Canadian Film, Short Subject, 1959
 Locarno Film Festival, Locarno: Diploma of Honour, 1959
 11th Canadian Film Awards, Toronto: Award of Merit, General Information, 1959
 Robert J. Flaherty Film Awards, City College Institute of Film Techniques: Honourable Mention, 1959
 American Film and Video Festival, New York: Blue Ribbon, Graphic Arts, Sculpture and Architecture, 1960
 Rapallo International Film Festival, Rapallo: Special Prize, Cup of the Minister of Tourism and Entertainment for Best Foreign Film, 1960
 Rapallo International Film Festival, Rapallo: Second Prize, Silver Cup of the Province of Genoa, 1960
 Festival of Tourist and Folklore Films, Brussels: CIDALC Medal of Honour, 1960
 SODRE International Festival of Documentary and Experimental Films, Montevideo: Honourable Mention 1960
 International Festival of Films on People and Countries, La Spezia: Silver Cup for the Most Popular Film of the Festival, 1967
 International Festival of Films on People and Countries, La Spezia: Medal for Best Ethnological Film, 1967
 International Maritime and Exploration Film Festival, Toulon: Ergo Prize of the Presidency of the Republic, 1969
 31st Academy Awards, Los Angeles: Nominee: Best Documentary Short Film, 1958City Out of Time (1959) 
 Vancouver International Film Festival, Vancouver: Special Diploma, Fine Arts, 1960Fishermen (1959) 
South African International Film Festival, Bloemfontein:  First Prize, Documentary, 1960
 International Agricultural Film Competition, Berlin: Third Prize - Bronze Ear of Grain, 1960
 Columbus International Film & Animation Festival, Columbus, Ohio: Chris Certificate, 1960 Radiation (1959)
 12th Canadian Film Awards, Toronto: Certificate of Merit, Training and Instruction, 1960The Back-Breaking Leaf (1959) 
 1960 Cannes Film Festival, Cannes: Eurovision Grand Prize, Documentary Films, 1960
 American Film and Video Festival, New York: Blue Ribbon, Agriculture, Conservation and Natural Resources, 1961
 International Labour and Industrial Film Festival, Antwerp: Diploma of Merit, Films Dealing with the Problems of People at Work, 1963Pangnirtung (1959)
 Okanagan Film Festival, Kelowna: First Prize, 1960The Cars in Your Life (1960) 
 American Film and Video Festival, New York: Blue Ribbon, Citizen, Government & City Planning, 1963Circle of the Sun (1960) 
 14th Canadian Film Awards: Genie Award for Best Film, General Information, 1962
 Yorkton Film Festival, Yorkton: Golden Sheaf Award, First Prize, 1962
 Festival of Tourist and Folklore Films, Brussels: Best Film on Folklore 1962
 La Plata International Children's Film Festival, La Plata: Silver Oak Leaf, First Prize, Documentary 1962
 Electronic, Nuclear and Teleradio Cinematographic Review, Rome: First Prize, Tourist Films 1962
 SODRE International Festival of Documentary and Experimental Films, Montevideo: Honorable Mention, 1962
 Victoria Film Festival, Victoria: Best Film, 1963
 International Tourism Film Festival, Tarbes: Diploma of Honour and Trophy 1967Universe (1960) 
 Cannes Film Festival, Cannes: Jury Prize for Exceptional Animation Quality, 1960
 Cannes Film Festival, Cannes: Technical Mention of the Commission Supérieure Technique du Cinéma Français, 1960
 International Festival of Scientific and Technical Films, Belgrade: Diploma of Honour, 1960
 Yorkton Film Festival, Yorkton: Golden Sheaf Award, Best Film of the Festival, 1960
 Vancouver International Film Festival, Vancouver: First Prize, Documentary, 1960
 Vancouver International Film Festival, Vancouver: Diploma, Scientific Films, 1960
 Stratford Film Festival, Stratford, Ontario: Special Commendation, 1960
 Cork International Film Festival, Cork: First Prize – Diploma of Merit, 1960 
 Edinburgh International Film Festival, Edinburgh: Diploma of Merit, Science, 1960
 14th British Academy Film Awards, London: BAFTA Award for Best Animated Film, 1961
 13th Canadian Film Awards: Genie Award for Film of the Year, 1961
 13th Canadian Film Awards: Genie Award for Best Theatrical Short, 1961
 Salerno Film Festival, Salerno: First Prize – Documentary, 1961
 American Film and Video Festival, New York: Blue Ribbon, Science and Mathematics, 1961
 Columbus International Film & Animation Festival, Columbus, Ohio: Chris Award, Information/Education, 1961
 Rapallo International Film Festival, Rapallo: Cup of the Minister of Tourism and Entertainment, 1961
 Philadelphia International Festival of Short Films, Philadelphia: Award for Exceptional Merit, 1961
 Mar del Plata International Film Festival, Mar del Plata: Grand Prize, 1962
 International Festival of Educational Films, Mar del Plata: Best Documentary, 1962
 La Plata International Children’s Festival, La Plata: Silver Oak Leaf, First Prize, Scientific Films, 1962
 Scientific Film Festival, Caracas: Award of Merit, 1963
 Scholastic Teacher Magazine Annual Film Awards, New York: Award of Merit, 1963
 International Educational Film Festival, Tehran: Golden Delfan, First Prize, Scientific Films, 1964
 Educational Film Library Association of America, New York: Nomination, 10 Best Films of the Decade List, 1968
 33rd Academy Awards, Los Angeles: Nominee: Best Documentary Short Subject, 1961A is for Architecture (1960) 
 Yorkton Film Festival, Yorkton: Golden Sheaf Award, First Prize, 1960
 12th Canadian Film Awards, Toronto: Genie Award for Best Film, General Information, 1960
 Ibero-American-Filipino Documentary Film Contest, Bilbao: Special CIDALC Prize, Silver Medal, 1960
 International Exhibition of Electronics, Nuclear Energy, Radio, Television and Cinema, Trieste: Silver Cup, 1960
 Rapallo International Film Festival, Rapallo: Third Prize - Silver Cup and Medal, 1960
 Yorkton Film Festival, Yorkton: Certificate of Merit, 1960
 Columbus International Film & Animation Festival, Columbus, Ohio: Chris Award, First Prize, 1962Microscopic Fungi (1960)
 International Exhibition of Scientific Film, Buenos Aires: Diploma of Honor, 1964Life in the Woodlot (1960)
 Salerno Film Festival, Salerno: Silver Cup of the Province of Salerno, 1961
 13th Canadian Film Awards, Toronto: Best Film, Films for Children, 1961Roughnecks: The Story of Oil Drillers (1960)
 San Sebastián International Film Festival, San Sebastián: First Prize, 1960
 Golden Gate International Film Festival, San Francisco: Silver Plaque for Best Industrial Film, 1960
 International Industrial Film Festival, Torino: First Prize in Category, 1961
 Columbus International Film & Animation Festival, Columbus, Ohio: Chris Certificate, Business and Industry, General Information for Public, 1961
 Yorkton Film Festival, Yorkton: First Prize, Industry and Agriculture, 1962
 HEMISFILM, San Antonio TX: Best Film, 1972Lonely Boy (1961) 
 Festival dei Popoli, Florence: Gold Medal, 1960
 1962 Cannes Film Festival, Cannes: Honorable Mention, Documentary Works, 1962
 International Days of Short Films, Tours: Special Jury Prize, 1962
 Edinburgh International Film Festival, Edinburgh: Honorable Mention, 1962
 Vancouver International Film Festival, Vancouver: First Prize, Documentary, 1962
 Ann Arbor Film Festival, Ann Arbor, Michigan: The Purchase Prize, 1963
 International Short Film Festival Oberhausen, Oberhausen: First Prize, Documentary, 1963
 15th Canadian Film Awards, Montreal: Film of the Year, 1963
 15th Canadian Film Awards, Montreal: Best Film, General Information, 1963Cattle Ranch (1961) 
 Locarno Film Festival, Locarno: Diploma of Honour, 1961
 Vancouver International Film Festival, Vancouver: Honourable Mention, Science and Agriculture, 1961
 International Festival of Films for Television, Rome: First Prize, Gold Plaque, Documentary, 1963
 Congrès du spectacle, Montreal: Best Documentary, 1966Do You Know the Milky Way? (1961)  
 International Days of Short Films, Tours: Special Jury Prize, 1961
 Columbus International Film & Animation Festival, Columbus, Ohio: Chris Award, Experimental, 1962Very Nice, Very Nice (1961) 
 34th Academy Awards – Nominee, Academy Award for Best Live Action Short Film, 1962The Days of Whiskey Gap (1961) 
 1961 Cannes Film Festival, Cannes: Grand Prize, Documentary, 1961
 Canadian Historical Association, Toronto: Certificate of Merit "for outstanding contribution to local history in Canada", 1962
 Vancouver International Film Festival, Vancouver: Honorable Mention, Sociology, 1962Runner (1962) 
 Golden Gate International Film Festival, San Francisco: Honorable Mention, Film as Art, 1963
 Midwest Film Festival, University of Chicago, Chicago: Donald Perry Award, 1963My Financial Career (1962)
 Golden Gate International Film Festival, San Francisco: First Prize, Animated Film, 1962
 American Film and Video Festival, New York: Blue Ribbon, Literature in Films, 1964
 36th Academy Awards, Los Angeles: Nominee, Best Short Subject, Cartoons, 1963The Joy of Winter (1962)
 Locarno Film Festival, Locarno: Diploma of Honour, 1962
 International Cinema Contest, Films for Children and Teenagers, Gijón: Best Film for Children, 1966
 International Cinema Contest, Films for Children and Teenagers, Gijón: Best Television Film, 1966Kindergarten (1962)
 International Filmfestival Mannheim-Heidelberg, Mannheim: Special Mention of the International Jury, 1963
 International Educational Film Festival, Tehran: Bronze Delfan, Third Prize, Educational Films, 1964The Living Machine (1962)
 Columbus International Film & Animation Festival, Columbus, Ohio: Chris Award, Public Information, 1963
 Villeurbanne Short Film Festival, Villeurbanne: Diploma of Honor, 1963The Climates of North America (1962)
 15th Canadian Film Awards, Montreal: Certificate of Merit, Films for Children, 1963
 Yorkton Film Festival, Yorkton: Golden Sheaf Award, First Prize, Science, 196421-87 (1963) 
 Ann Arbor Film Festival, Ann Arbor, Michigan: First Prize, 1964
 Palo Alto Filmmakers’ Festival, Palo Alto: Second Prize, 1964
 Midwest Film Festival, University of Chicago, Chicago: Most Popular Film, 1964Pipers and A’ (1963)
 Canadian Tourist Association Awards, Toronto: First Prize, Canuck Award, 1964The Great Toy Robbery (1963)
 Cork International Film Festival, Cork: St. Finbarr Statuette, First Prize, Animated Film and Cartoon, 1963
 Belgrade Documentary and Short Film Festival, Belgrade: Diploma, 1964
 Landers Associates Annual Awards, Los Angeles: Award of Merit, 1969Sky (1963)
 Columbus International Film & Animation Festival, Columbus, Ohio: Chris Award, Special Fields, 1964
 Jubilee International Film Festival, Swift Current: First Prize, Natural Sciences, 1964A Christmas Fantasy (1963)
 Columbus International Film & Animation Festival, Columbus, Ohio: Chris Certificate 1964I Know an Old Lady Who Swallowed a Fly (1963) 
 Chicago International Film Festival, Chicago: Certificate of Merit – Cartoons, 1965
 Zlín Film Festival/International Film Festival for Children and Youth, Gottwaldov, Czechoslovakia: Diploma of Merit, 1965
 Santa Barbara Children’s Film Festival, Santa Barbara, California: Second Satellite Award, Short Entertainment, 1966Christmas Cracker (1963)
 Golden Gate International Film Festival, San Francisco: First Prize, Best Animated Short, 1964
 Electronic, Nuclear and Teleradio Cinematographic Review, Rome: Grand Prize for Technique, Films for Children, 1965
 Electronic, Nuclear and Teleradio Cinematographic Review, Rome: Grand Prize for Animation Technique, 1965
 Landers Associates Annual Awards, Los Angeles: Award of Merit, 1965
 Film Centrum Foundation Film Show, Naarden: Silver Squirrel, Second Prize 1966
 Philadelphia International Festival of Short Films, Philadelphia: Award of Exceptional Merit, 1967
 37th Academy Awards, Los Angeles: Nominee: Best Short Subject – Cartoons, 1965Legault’s Place (1964) 
 Chicago International Film Festival, Chicago: Diploma of Merit, 1965
 Melbourne Film Festival, Melbourne: Diploma of Merit, 1966The Edge of the Barrens (1964)
 Yorkton Film Festival, Yorkton: Golden Sheaf Award for Best Film of the Festival, 1964
 Yorkton Film Festival, Yorkton: First Prize, Natural History, 1964
 Venice Film Festival, Venice: Second Prize, Children’s Films, 1964
 Weyburn Film Festival, Weyburn: First Prize, 1965
 International Exhibition of Scientific Film, Buenos Aires: Special Mention, 1966Nobody Waved Goodbye (1964) 
 18th British Academy Film Awards, London: BAFTA Award for Best Documentary, 1965
 International Filmfestival Mannheim-Heidelberg, Mannheim: CIDALC Award, 1964
 International Film Festival at Addis Ababa, Addis Ababa, Ethiopia: Third Prize, Feature Film, 1966
 Salerno Film Festival, Salerno: First Prize, 1968
 Toronto International Film Festival, Toronto: 9th Place, Canada’s Ten-Best Films, 1984Above the Horizon (1964) 
 International Survey of Scientific and Didactic Films, Padua: First Prize, Didactic Films, 1965
 Australian and New Zealand Association for the Advancement of Science (ANZAAS), Sydney: Orbit Award, 1966
 18th Canadian Film Awards, Montreal: Best Film for Children, 1966
 International Exhibition of Scientific Film, Buenos Aires: Diploma of Honor, 1966
 International Scientific Film Festival, Lyon: Honorable Mention for Popularization of a Scientific Subject, 1969
 Electronic, Nuclear and Teleradio Cinematographic Review, Rome: Best Film in the Scientific Category, 1970Free Fall (1964)
 Golden Gate International Film Festival, San Francisco: Award of Merit, 1964
 Montreal International Film Festival, Montreal: Honorable Mention, Shorts, 1964Eskimo Artist: Kenojuak (1964) 
 18th British Academy Film Awards, London: BAFTA Award for Best Short Film, 1964
 Venice Film Festival, Venice: Special Mention, 1964
 Cork International Film Festival, Cork: Statuette of St. Finbarr - First Prize, Art Films, 1964
 Vancouver International Film Festival, Vancouver: Certificate of Merit, 1964
 Festival of Tourist and Folklore Films, Brussels: Gold Medal - First Prize, 1965
 Melbourne International Film Festival, Melbourne: Silver Boomerang - Second Prize, 1965
 International Exhibition of Scientific Film, Buenos Aires: Second Prize in Category, 1965
 Columbus International Film & Animation Festival, Columbus, Ohio: Chris Award, Education & Information, 1966
 Panama International Film Festival, Panama City: Grand Prize for Best Documentary, 1966
 Tokyo International Film Festival, Tokyo: Certificate of Merit, 1966
 Thessaloniki International Film Festival, Thessaloniki: First Prize, Foreign Film, 1967
 Festival of Cultural Films, La Felguera: Silver Plaque, 1967
 American Film and Video Festival, New York: First Prize, Graphic Arts, Sculpture and Architecture, 1967
 FIBA International Festival of Buenos Aires, Buenos Aires: Diploma of Honor, 1968
 Philadelphia International Festival of Short Films, Philadelphia: Award of Exceptional Merit, 1971
 37th Academy Awards, Los Angeles: Nominee: Best Documentary Short Subject, 1965Jet Pilot (1964)
 Columbus International Film & Animation Festival, Columbus, Ohio: Chris Award, First Prize, Information/Education, 1964The Hutterites (1964) 
 Montreal International Film Festival, Montreal: First Prize, Shorts, 1964
 Columbus International Film & Animation Festival, Columbus, Ohio: Chris Award, First Prize, Religion, 1964
 Yorkton Film Festival, Yorkton: Golden Sheaf Award, First Prize, Human Relations, 1964
 Melbourne Film Festival, Melbourne: Honorable Mention, 1964
 American Film and Video Festival, New York: Blue Ribbon, Doctrinal and Denominational Topics, 1965
 Landers Associates Awards, Los Angeles: Award of Merit, 1965
 Festival dei Popoli/International Film Festival on Social Documentary, Florence: Second Prize, 1965An Essay on Science (1964)
 International Industrial Film Festival, London: Third Prize, General Information, 1964
 Australian and New Zealand Association for the Advancement of Science (ANZAAS), Sydney: Special Mention, 1964
 International Exhibition of Scientific Film, Buenos Aires: Diploma of Honor, 1966High Steel (1965) 
 Cork International Film Festival, Cork: Bronze Statuette of St. Finbarr - First Prize, Documentary, 1966
 Locarno Film Festival, Locarno: Diploma of Honour, 1967
 Kraków Film Festival, Kraków: Diploma of Honour, 1967
 Melbourne Film Festival, Melbourne: Diploma of Merit, 1967
 International Days of Short Films, Tours: Prize of the Cine-Clubs, 1967
 Berlin International Film Festival, Berlin: Special Youth Prize, 1967Stravinsky (1965) 
 Montreal International Film Festival, Montreal: Special Mention, Short Films, 1965Island Observed (1966)
 International Exhibition of Scientific Film, Buenos Aires: Special Mention, 1967Helicopter Canada (1966)
 19th Canadian Film Awards, Toronto: Best Film, General Information, 1967
 19th Canadian Film Awards, Toronto: Special Prize: “For providing a superbly appropriate and inspiring opportunity for Canadians to view their country in the Centennial Year”, 1967
 Canadian Travel Film Awards, Toronto: First Prize, 1967
 International Travel Documentary Film Festival, New Delhi: Special Prize, 1967
 Adelaide International Film Festival, Adelaide: Diploma, 1969
 39th Academy Awards, Los Angeles: Nominee: Best Documentary Feature, 1967The Forest (1966) 
 Cork International Film Festival, Cork: First Prize – Certificate of Merit, Industrial Films, 1966 
 Yorkton Film Festival, Yorkton: Golden Sheaf Award, Best Film, Industry and Agriculture 1967Poen (1967)
 Zinebi - Bilbao International Documentary and Short Film Festival, Bilbao: Bronze Miqueldi, 1968
 International Short Film Festival Oberhausen, Oberhausen: Diploma, 1968Danny and Nicky (1969)
 Canadian Association for the Mentally Retarded National Symposium, London, Ontario: Citation “In recognition of the educational contribution in the mental health field", 1969
 Conference on Children, Washington DC: Certificate of Merit, 1970
 Rio Cine Festival, Rio de Janeiro: Third Prize - Jacarandah Wood Trophy, Silver Plaque, Documentary, 1971Mrs. Ryan's Drama Class (1969)
 Conference on Children, Washington DC: Certificate of Merit, 1970Falling from Ladders (1969)
 Philadelphia International Festival of Short Films, Philadelphia: Award for Exceptional Merit, 1971Untouched and Pure (1970)
 Chicago International Film Festival, Chicago: Silver Hugo, Education, 1971Prologue (1970)
 23rd British Academy Film Awards, London: BAFTA Award for Best Documentary, 1970
 Film Critics and Journalists Association of Ceylon, Colombo: First Prize, 1970Half-Half-Three-Quarters-Full (1970)
 International Week of Nautical Cinema, Palma: Silver Plate, First Prize, Best Short in Category, 1972
 CIDALC International Sport Film Festival, Reims: President of the Republic Award, 1972
 International Review of Maritime Documentary / International Film, TV Film and Documentary Film Market (MIFED), Milan: Festival Trophy, 1972
 International Sports Film Festival, Cortina d'Ampezzo: Silver Medal given by the Italian National Olympic Committee, 1972
 British International Sport Film and Television Festival (Videosport), Milton Keynes: Judges’ Award, 1975Espolio (1970) 
 Columbus International Film & Animation Festival, Columbus, Ohio: Chris Statuette, Religion and Ethics, 1971
 Melbourne International Film Festival, Melbourne: Diploma of Merit, 1971
 American Film and Video Festival, New York: Red Ribbon, 1971
 Hawaii Film Festival, Honolulu: Third Prize, 1972November (1970)
 Melbourne International Film Festival, Melbourne: Special Prize, Silver Boomerang, 1972Legend (1970)
 22nd Canadian Film Awards, Toronto: Best Film, Arts and Experimental, 1970
 American Film and Video Festival, New York: Red Ribbon, 1971Pillar of Wisdom (1970)
 Cork International Film Festival, Cork: St. Finbarr Statuette, First Prize, Documentary and General Interest, 1971Sad Song of Yellow Skin (1970)
 24th British Academy Film Awards, London: BAFTA Award for Best Documentary, 1971
 Melbourne International Film Festival, Melbourne: Silver Boomerang, Best Film, 1971
 HEMISFILM, San Antonio TX: Best Film, 1971
 Festival of World Television, Los Angeles: Best Documentary, 1971
 American Film and Video Festival, New York: Blue Ribbon, 1971
 American Film and Video Festival, New York: Emily Award, 1971
 22nd Canadian Film Awards, Toronto: Special Award for Reportage, 1970
 Atlanta Film Festival: Gold Medal, Special Jury Award, 1971This is a Photograph (1971) 
 24th Canadian Film Awards, Toronto: Genie Award for Best Theatrical Short Film, 1972
 Venice Film Festival, Venice: Silver Medal, 1973Norman Jewison, Film Maker (1971)
 Chicago International Film Festival, Chicago: Silver Hugo, Documentary, Local Broadcast, 1972
 Melbourne International Film Festival, Melbourne: Special Prize, Silver Boomerang, 1972Wet Earth and Warm People (1971)
 Golden Gate International Film Festival, San Francisco: Honourable Mention, Sociological Studies of Specific Groups or Lifestyles in a Society, 1972
 Atlanta Film Festival, Atlanta: Bronze Medal, Feature, 1972
 Melbourne International Film Festival, Melbourne: Diploma of Merit, 1972The Mechanical Knee (1971)
 International Festival of Red Cross and Health Films, Varna, Bulgaria: Silver Medal in Category, 1973The Sea (1971)
 23rd Canadian Film Awards, Toronto: Genie Award for Best Documentary Under 30 minutes, 1971
 International Film Festival of Man, Air, Water, Versailles: First Prize of the Festival, 1972
 International Review of Maritime Documentary / International Film, TV Film and Documentary Film Market (MIFED), Milan: Jury Award - Gold Medal of the President of the Republic, 1972
 Melbourne International Film Festival, Melbourne: Diploma of Merit, 1972
 International Week of Nautical Cinema, Palma: Gold Anchovy, 1974
 International Documentary Film Days on the Environment, Ouistreham-Riva-Bella: Gold Medal and Grand Prize of the President of the Republic, 1974Pandora (1971)
 Philadelphia International Festival of Short Films, Philadelphia: Award for Exceptional Merit, 1971
 Atlanta Film Festival, Atlanta: Silver Medal, Experimental Live Action, 1972The Sloane Affair (1972)
 25th Canadian Film Awards, Montreal: Genie Award for Best Television Drama, 1973The Huntsman (1972)
 Cork International Film Festival, Cork: St. Finbarr Statuette, First Place, Short Fiction Film, 1972
 FIBA International Festival of Buenos Aires, Buenos Aires: Honorable Mention, 1974Centaur (1972) 
 Yorkton Film Festival, Yorkton: Golden Sheaf Award for Best Sports and Recreation Film, 1973 
 Chantilly Festival, ‘The Horse in Cinema’, Chantilly, Oise: Grand Festival Prize, 1980Accident (1973)
 American Film and Video Festival, New York: Red Ribbon, Mental Health, 1975Coming Home (1973) 
 25th Canadian Film Awards, Montreal: Genie Award for Best Theatrical Documentary, 1973The Man Who Can’t Stop (1973)
 Chicago International Film Festival, Chicago: Certificate of Merit, 1974Action: The October Crisis of 1970 (1973)
 Visions du Réel, Nyon: Grand Prize for Best Documentary, 1975
 Chicago International Film Festival, Chicago: Silver Plaque, Feature Film, Documentary, 1975Sananguagat: Inuit Masterworks (1974) 
 Festival international du film sur l'art, Paris: Grand Prize, 1975
 International Tourism Film Festival, Tarbes: Award of Merit, 1975In Praise of Hands (1974)
 International Craft Film Festival, New York: Award of Merit, 1976
 International Festival of Television Programs of Folk Crafts (RADUGA), Moscow: Diploma for Impressive Transmission of Deep Thought of Unity of the Sources of Folk Creativity, 1979Waiting for Fidel (1974)
 American Film and Video Festival, New York: Red Ribbon, World Concerns, 1976Mr. Symbol Man (1974)
 Australian Film Awards: Sydney: Golden Reel, Documentary, 1975
 Golden Gate International Film Festival, San Francisco: Bronze Reel, Documentary, 1975
 International Film Festival on Education, Mexico City: First Prize, Didactic Films, 1976
 Melbourne International Film Festival, Melbourne: Second Prize - Silver Boomerang and Victorian Government Prize, 1978Descent (1975)
 Banff Mountain Film Festival, Banff, Alberta: Best Film of the Festival, 1977
 Banff Mountain Film Festival, Banff, Alberta: Best Film Produced by a Canadian, 1977Musicanada (1975)
 Golden Gate International Film Festival, San Francisco: Special Jury Award, 1976Blackwood (1976)
 Festival international du film sur l'art, Paris: Grand Prize for the Quality of the Image, 1977
 Festival of Tourist and Folklore Films, Brussels: Prize of the Principality of Monaco for the Best Film Evocating the Past of a Region by the Means of Art, 1977
 Yorkton Film Festival, Yorkton: Golden Sheaf Award, Best Short Film, 1977
 49th Academy Awards, Los Angeles: Nominee, Best Documentary Short Subject, 1977Los Canadienses (1976) 
 30th British Academy Film Awards, London: BAFTA Award for Best Documentary, 1977
 Chicago International Film Festival, Chicago: Silver Hugo Award, 1977
 Yorkton Film Festival, Yorkton: Golden Sheaf Award, Best Documentary, 1977
 Melbourne Film Festival: TV Award for Best Film Made for TV, 1977
 American Film and Video Festival, New York: Blue Ribbon, International History and Culture, 1977
 International Filmfestival Mannheim-Heidelberg, Mannheim: Special Mention from the Fédération internationale de la presse cinématographique, 1976
 International Filmfestival Mannheim-Heidelberg, Mannheim: Special Prize for the Best Film, 1976One Man (1977) 
 ACTRA Awards, Montreal: Film of the Year, 1978
 Film Festival Antwerpen, Antwerp: Second Best Film of the Festival, 1978
 Film Festival Antwerpen, Antwerp: Honorable Mention by the Press Jury, 1978I’ll Go Again (1977)
 Yorkton Film Festival, Yorkton: Golden Sheaf Award for Best Sports and Recreation Film, 1977
 International Sports Film Festival, Budapest: First Jury Award, 1977Travel Log (1978)
 Yorkton Film Festival, Yorkton: Golden Sheaf Award for Best Experimental Film, 1979
 Cork International Film Festival, Cork: Certificate of Merit, 1979
 Kraków Film Festival, Kraków: Silver Dragon, 1979
 Melbourne International Film Festival, Melbourne: Special Award - Silver Boomerang, 1980Meditation in Motion (1978)
 Dance on Camera Festival, New York: Certificate of Merit, 1980An Easy Pill to Swallow (1978)
 Columbus International Film & Animation Festival, Columbus, Ohio: Chris Bronze Plaque, Health and Medicine, 1980The Last Days of Living (1980)
 Chicago International Film Festival, Chicago: Gold Plaque, Social Issues, 1980 
 Golden Gate International Film Festival, San Francisco: Honorable Mention, Honorable Mention, 1980
 HEMA (Health Education Media Association) Film Festival, Philadelphia: Best of Show, 1981
 Columbus International Film & Animation Festival, Columbus, Ohio: Chris Award, Bronze Plaque, 1981
 Medikinale, Marburg: Gold Medal, Specialized Information Films, 1982
 Medikinale, Marburg: Gold Medal, Grand Prize of the University of Marburg, 1982North China Commune (1980)
 Columbus International Film & Animation Festival, Columbus, Ohio - Chris Bronze Plaque, Social Studies, 1980Standing Alone (1982)
 HEMISFILM, San Antonio TX: Bronze Medallion for Best Long Documentary, 1983
 International Film Festival for Children and Young People, Vancouver: Certificate of Merit, 1983Time for Caring (1982) 
 International Rehabilitation Film Festival, New York: Certificate of Merit, 1983

References

Bibliography

 Ellis, Jack C. John Grierson: Life, Contributions, Influence. Carbondale, Illinois: Southern Illinois University Press, 2000. .
 Evans, Gary. John Grierson and the National Film Board: The Politics of Wartime Propaganda. Toronto: University of Toronto Press, 1984. .
 Jones, D.B. The Best Butler in the Business: Tom Daly of the National Film Board of Canada. Toronto: University of Toronto Press, 1996. .
 Khouri, Malek. Filming Politics: Communism and the Portrayal of the Working Class at the National Film Board of Canada, 1939-46. Calgary, Alberta, Canada: University of Calgary Press, 2007. .
 McInnes, Graham. One Man's Documentary: A Memoir of the Early Years of the National Film Board''. Winnipeg, Manitoba: University of Manitoba, 2004. .

External links

 Films directed by Tom Daly at the National Film Board of Canada
"Final farewell to prolific NFB filmmaker and producer Tom Daly", National Film Board of Canada

Officers of the Order of Canada
1918 births
2011 deaths
Film producers from Quebec
Film directors from Ontario
Canadian film editors
Canadian animated film directors
Canadian animated film producers
National Film Board of Canada people
Canadian documentary film producers
University of Toronto alumni
Film directors from Toronto
Anglophone Quebec people
People from Westmount, Quebec
Film directors from Quebec